The 1954 Yugoslav Cup was the 8th season of the top football knockout competition in SFR Yugoslavia, the Yugoslav Cup, also known as the "Marshal Tito Cup" (Kup Maršala Tita), since its establishment in 1946.

Round of 16
In the following tables winning teams are marked in bold; teams from outside top level are marked in italic script.

Quarter-finals

Semi-finals

Final

See also
1954–55 Yugoslav First League
1954–55 Yugoslav Second League

External links
1954 Yugoslav Cup details at Rec.Sport.Soccer Statistics Foundation

1954
Cup